Road signs in Hong Kong are standardised by the Transport Department. Due to being a former British territory, the road signage in Hong Kong is similar to road signs in the United Kingdom, with the addition of Traditional Chinese characters.

Design and language

Road signs in Hong Kong closely follow those used in the United Kingdom, and complies with the Vienna Convention on Road Signs and Signals, a legacy of the city's previous British overseas territory status. Signs normally use the Transport Medium typeface on dark backgrounds or Transport Heavy on light backgrounds, which is identical to the use in the United Kingdom, Republic of Ireland and most of the current and previous British Overseas Territories

Road signs placed in the 2000s to 2010s commonly use Arial Narrow or Helvetica, with or without a modified letter 'L'; street signs sometimes also use Helvetica. The newest signs built after 2016 have increasingly resumed the use of Transport; some signs on recently completed expressways use Transport Heavy on dark backgrounds.

Writing system on the traffic signs comprises British English and traditional Chinese, two official languages of Hong Kong, in an order of English above Traditional Chinese.

Warnings
Signs warning of hazardous conditions or dangerous situations (e.g. "Intersection" or "Steep incline ahead" bear a black-on-white symbol inside a red-bordered triangle (point uppermost).

Regulatory
With the exception of the special shapes used for "Stop" and "Give Way" signs (respectively, an octagon and a downward-pointing triangle), signs giving orders are circular and are of two kinds:

Prohibitory signs (e.g. "No left turn") take the form of a black-on-white symbol inside a red-bordered circle, sometimes with the addition of a red slash through the symbol.
Mandatory signs (e.g. "Turn right only") bear a white symbol on a blue disk.

Temporary/Construction
Temporary road signs (e.g. Red rectangular signs with instructions in white)

Guide

Guide signs are generally rectangular (sometimes pointed at one end in the case of direction signage).

Obsolete

Post-Worboys

Pre-Worboys

References 

Hong Kong
Transport in Hong Kong